Adam Bowman (4 August 1880 – 4 February 1937) was a Scottish professional footballer who played in the Football League for Blackburn Rovers, Leeds City and Everton as an inside left or centre forward.

Personal life 
After retiring from football, Bowman settled in Blackburn and became the licensee of a number of pubs.

Career statistics

References

Scottish footballers
Brentford F.C. players
English Football League players
Association football inside forwards
Leith Athletic F.C. players
Leeds City F.C. players
Southern Football League players
1880 births
People from Forfar
1937 deaths
St Johnstone F.C. players
Scottish Football League players
East Stirlingshire F.C. players
Everton F.C. players
Blackburn Rovers F.C. players
Portsmouth F.C. players
Forfar Athletic F.C. players
Accrington Stanley F.C. (1891) players
St Bernard's F.C. players
Footballers from Angus, Scotland